The Elizabeth Shopping Centre or Elizabeth City Centre is a large regional shopping centre located in the outer Adelaide suburb of Elizabeth, South Australia The centre is the fourth biggest in Adelaide, behind Colonnades Shopping Centre, Westfield Tea Tree Plaza, and Westfield Marion.

Tenants 
Major tenants in Elizabeth City Centre include:

 Target
 Big W
 Harris Scarfe
 Coles
 Woolworths
 Reading Cinemas
 Rebel
 JB Hi-Fi
 Best & Less
 Timezone
 Formerly Myer which closed in February 2014.

Transport and access
The centre is serviced by a local train station on Elizabeth Way, and Adelaide Metro buses at the bus interchange on Oxenham Drive. There are three taxi ranks, located near the leisure precinct, Harris Scarfe and Coles.

References

External links
 Elizabeth City Centre website

Shopping centres in Adelaide
Shopping malls established in 1984